Tyrant is an upcoming South Korean action-film directed by Park Hoon-jung, starring Cha Seung-won Kim Seon-ho, and Kim Kang-woo.

Synopsis 
The last sample of the tyrant program disappears due to a delivery accident. There are people chasing each other for different purposes to claim the last sample.

Cast 
 Cha Seung-won as Lim Sang-won, a former agent tasked with eliminating the forces related to the tyrant program.
 Kim Seon-ho as Choi Guk-jang, who has been running an unofficial tyrant program.
 Kim Kang-woo as Paul, a member of an overseas intelligence agency trying to dispose of the last sample of tyrant program.

Production 
On January 9, 2023, the movie distributor Ace Maker Movie Works announced the confirmed casts and stated that filming began on January 2, 2023.

References

External links
 

Upcoming films
2020s Korean-language films
South Korean drama films
Films shot in South Korea